This is a list of tennis players who have represented the Slovakia Fed Cup team in an official Fed Cup match. Slovakia have taken part in the competition since 1994. Slovak players previously competed as part of the Czechoslovak team.

Players

References

External links
Slovenský Tenisový Zväz

Fed Cup
Lists of Billie Jean King Cup tennis players